"The Glory That Was..." is an eighth season episode of Law & Order: Criminal Intent and the 163rd episode overall. This episode marks the half-point of the season. This episode was originally set to air after "Faithfully" which was set to be the season premiere episode.

Plot
Detectives Nichols and Wheeler, together with Captain Ross, find themselves on the world stage, untangling the politics behind the Olympic Site Selection Committee.

At the top of the show, a wealthy Belgian diplomat, Caroline Walters, is found murdered in Central Park. Nearby, a second body is discovered: a former Secret Service agent hired to protect her. Nichols and Wheeler begin their investigation at the Belgian Consulate, where they meet high-profile security consultant Jack Taylor — who, it turns out, hired the now-dead agent meant to protect Walters.

The detectives turn their attention to threats made against Walters, and soon a DVD surfaces that suggests she was being blackmailed: the DVD contains images of her making love with another woman, Laura Green.

When interrogated, Green claims that she, too, was being blackmailed. But soon, when her story fails to hold up, and after an attempt on her life, Nichols and Wheeler know they have their killer: Green was the blackmailer and someone now wants her dead. The detectives know that someone else is involved.

Nichols, in what will be a signature element of the show, retreats from the case, in order to garner perspective. In this episode, he goes to the Film Forum, in Greenwich Village, to watch Breakfast at Tiffany's. It is while watching the film that he finally puts the pieces together.

In the aria of the show, Nichols interrogates Taylor, who has branch offices throughout the world. Pulling on the strings that hold the tightly wound Taylor together, Nichols leads Taylor directly into a noose of self-incrimination. Taylor expected to win a security contract in Rio de Janeiro. Walters, it turns out, was the vote he needed on the Olympic Site Selection Committee that would throw the Olympics to Rio.

Cast

Reaction
Aired in Brazil on September 3, 2009 by AXN, this episode caused uproar at the headquarters of Rio de Janeiro bid for the 2016 Summer Olympics. Mayor Eduardo Paes expressed disgust for the show, claiming it was "ridiculous and pathetic". State governor Sérgio Cabral Filho said jokingly that "now even [Law & Order's] screenwriters are desperate." The uproar was significant enough that the episode was not included in the official DVD release for the season.

References

External links
 
 Official website

Law & Order: Criminal Intent (season 8) episodes
2009 American television episodes